Mariebergs IK is a now defunct Swedish football and bandy club which was located in Stockholm. The club was founded in 1902 and was nicknamed Maris.

Mariebergs IK were one of the better clubs in Sweden in the early 20th century, and they played one season in the highest level of the time, Svenska Serien, in 1911–12. In bandy, they reached the national championship semifinal in 1919.

Achievements
 Wicanderska Välgörenhetsskölden:
 Runners-up (3): 1907, 1909, 1912

References

Defunct football clubs in Sweden
Football clubs in Stockholm
1902 establishments in Sweden
Association football clubs established in 1902
Bandy clubs established in 1902
Defunct bandy clubs in Sweden